Hwang Chan-sung (born February 11, 1990), also known mononymously as Chansung, is a South Korean singer, rapper, songwriter and actor. He is a member of the Korean boy band 2PM. He made his debut as an actor in the 2006 comedy series Unstoppable High Kick, and since then has gone on to star in the Japanese drama Kaitō Royale (2011) and 7th Grade Civil Servant (2013).

Early life
Hwang was born in Seoul, South Korea, where he still resides. He was educated at Korean Arts High School and took an undergraduate program at Howon University (Gunsan, South Korea) with his bandmates Junho and Wooyoung. In addition, along with Junho, he is continuing a master's degree of cinematography at Sejong University.

Career

Pre-debut
Hwang was a television actor, having played roles in MBC's 2006 comedy sitcom Unstoppable High Kick and then in KBS2's 2008 teen drama Jungle Fish.  The drama won a number of awards, including the Peabody Award. It was also during this time, in 2006, that he auditioned for, and was named, one of the dozen finalists (including his future bandmates Lee Junho and Taecyeon) to compete in the show "Superstar Survival".

Music career

In 2008, he took part in Mnet's Hot Blood Men which follows the extreme training of 13 trainees in order to become a member of the boy band One Day. One Day spawned two boy bands, 2AM and 2PM, of which the latter one Hwang became a member of. Six months after Hot Blood was aired on TV, 2PM debuted with their first single "10점 만점에 10점" ("10 Points out of 10 Points") from their first EP Hottest Time of the Day, but it wasn't until their second EP 2:00PM Time For Change which skyrocketed their success in the Korean music industry. As of 2017, the group has released six studio albums in Korea and four studio albums in Japan.

Acting career

In 2011, Hwang making a cameo appearance in Dream High as Oh-sun's imaginary boy (episode 12) and Japanese drama Kaitō Royale as Jack

On January 23, 2013, Hwang had a supporting role in a spy romantic comedy series, 7th Grade Civil Servant as Gong Do-ha. The same year, Hwang takes on the role of a newbie gangster Hyeong-ju in Your Noir.

In 2015 he making a cameo appearance in Dream Knight episode 12.

In 2016, Hwang was cast in the romantic comedy drama My Horrible Boss as Nam Bong-gi, after two and a half years since the 2013 drama Your Noir and made another impressive cameo appearance in the SBS drama Dr. Romantic.

In 2017 he was casting for a special cameo appearance as Eun Bong Hee's (Nam Ji Hyun) ex-boyfriend in SBS drama Suspicious Partner and he appeared in KBS2's drama Queen for Seven Days as Seo No, the bodyguard and friend of Lee Yeok (Yeon Woo Jin). The same year, he made his official debut as a stage actor for the play My Love, My Bride and musical Altar Boyz in Japan, Hwang played the role of the band's leader Matthew.

In 2018 Hwang starred in TvN Drama What's Wrong with Secretary Kim and he was given two awards after his work, Hallyu Star Award and Male Excellence Award at the 11th Korea Drama Awards. He then starred in promotional web series produced for Lotte Duty Free Shop, Secret Queen Makers in the first and second episodes.

In 2018 he making a cameo appearance in romantic comedy drama Touch Your Heart he played the role of a delivery man who catches the eye of timid lawyer Dan Moon Hee (Park Kyung Hye).

On February 7, 2020, Hwang starred Netflix series My Holo Love

In 2021, Hwang and Nichkhun made special cameo appearances in Vincenzo to support their bandmate Ok Taec-yeon, who landed a role in the series.

On April 30, 2021, Hwang's drama So I Married the Anti-fan premiered on Naver TV, with simultaneous broadcast through V Live and global platforms iQIYI, Viki and Amazon Prime Video in Japan  The drama was originally filmed in 2018  and based on the 2010 novel So I Married The Anti Fan, which was made into a webtoon and also adapted into a Chinese film 

On December 15, 2021, Hwang announced that he would be ending his contract with JYP Entertainment in January 2022. On March 3, 2022, Hwang signed an exclusive contract with L' July Entertainment.

In August 2022, Hwang opened the YouTube cooking channel 'Yochan Lee.

In December 2022, Hwang will hold his first solo photo exhibition 'NAHC NAHC' at the exhibition hall on the 3rd floor of AK Plaza in Hongdae from January 6 to 12, 2023.

Personal life
Hwang speaks fluent Korean, intermediate Japanese, and basic English. He is also a trained martial artist, having achieved high levels in Taekwondo and Kumdo. Hwang revealed on Our Neighborhood Arts and Physical Education that he holds a 3rd degree black belt in Taekwondo. On June 1, 2012, JYP Entertainment announced through their official Twitter that Hwang will be opening a fitness center with his weight trainer, Hwang Mo. The fitness center is located in Nonhyun-dong (논현동), Seoul. 

Hwang enlisted in the Army for his mandatory military service on June 11, 2019, and was discharged on January 5, 2021.

Relationship and marriage 
On December 15, 2021, it was announced that Hwang's fiancée is pregnant and they would be getting married early next year. Their first child, a daughter, was born on July 26, 2022.

Filmography

Film

Television series

Web series

Variety show

Theater

Discography

Extended plays

Collaborations

Compositions

Awards and nominations

References

External links
 

1990 births
Living people
2PM members
21st-century South Korean male actors
Howon University alumni
JYP Entertainment artists
Male actors from Seoul
Musicians from Seoul
People from Seoul
South Korean Buddhists
South Korean male film actors
South Korean male idols
South Korean male singers
South Korean male taekwondo practitioners
South Korean male television actors
South Korean pop singers
South Korean male web series actors
Singers from Seoul